Hassan Khalil is the former Head of Military Intelligence Directorate (Syria), serving from 2000 to 2005. Khalil was previously deputy director from 1993 to 2000.

Prior to the Syrian civil war Hassan Khalil was a key figure in Syria's bid for improved relations with the United States and the West, using intelligence sharing as an important element for cooperation.

Controversies

Implication in Rafic Hariri assassination 
Hassan Khalil was one of several high-ranking Syrian government and military officials named as responsible for the assassination of Rafic Hariri in a draft of the United Nations Mehlis Report that was erroneously released as a Microsoft Word document which preserved changes that had been made in the document since its creation. The official Mehlis Report made no specific mention of anyone in the Syrian government as responsible for the assassination. The Syrian ambassador to Washington, Imad Mustafa, said that the report is "full of political rumors, gossip, and hearsay."

Role in quelling civilian opposition in Syrian civil war 
Syrian President Bashar al-Assad relied on Hassan Khalil in his capacity as head of Military Intelligence, to quel internal dissent with an "iron fist" during the Syrian uprising.

References

Syrian generals
Syrian Alawites
Homs Military Academy alumni